Malvar is a surname. Notable people with the surname include:
Fernando Malvar-Ruiz (born 1968), Equatorial Guinean musician
Julia Becerra Malvar (1892–1974), Spanish politician
Marciano Malvar Guzman (died 2009), Filipino philosopher
Marie Malvar (1983–2003), murder victim of Gary Ridgway
Miguel Malvar (1865–1911), Filipino general
Rico Malvar (born 1953), Brazilian engineer and signal processing researcher
Therese Malvar (born 2000), Filipina actress